St. Mary Anne's Episcopal Church is an historic Episcopal church building located at 315 South Main Street in North East, Cecil County, Maryland. Built in 1742 of red brick in a rectangular shape to replace an earlier wooden church building on the site, it is the second parish church building for North Elk Parish, later known as St. Mary Anne's Parish, which had been established in 1706 by the General Assembly of the Province of Maryland. Originally dedicated to St. Mary, the parish added Anne to its name in thanks for a bequest it received from the estate of Anne, Queen of Great Britain, who died in 1714. Its bell tower was added in 1904.

St. Mary Anne's is still an active parish in the Episcopal Diocese of Easton. The Rev. John Schaeffer is the current rector.

History
The church was established by the governor of Maryland along the north shore of the Elk River in 1706, with four acres of land set aside for a church building. Between 1709 and 1715, a wooden church was built on the site of the present church, but no details are known about this building. A Swedish Lutheran Reverend, Jonas Auren who had come to America in the late 1600s, preached here for a congregation made of Swedes and Finns from the former colony of New Sweden, as well as English colonists, until his death in 1713. During this time the church was known as St. Mary's parish. In 1714, Queen Anne of England died. In an effort to establish the Anglican Church in the colonies she bequeathed a large Bible, a Book of Common Prayer and a silver chalice and paten to the congregation. In a gesture of appreciation, St. Mary's was renamed St. Mary Anne's.

In 1845 St. Marks's, Perryville opened as a chapel of ease for St. Mary's Parish. In 1913, St. Mark's was established as Susquehanna Parish.

Cemetery
Burials in St. Mary Anne's historic cemetery include:
 Thomas Russell (1743–1786), ironmonger and manager of Principio Furnace, brother of William Russell
 John Conard (1773–1857), Pennsylvania congressman

See also

 List of post 1692 Anglican parishes in the Province of Maryland

Gallery

References

External links
 Historic American Buildings Survey, 3 photos
 St. Mary Anne's Episcopal Church website
 Skirven, Percy G., The First Parishes of the Province of Maryland, Baltimore: Norman Remington Co., 1923
 Waymarking listing for St. Mary Anne's Church

Episcopal church buildings in Maryland
Anglican parishes in the Province of Maryland
Churches in Cecil County, Maryland
Churches completed in 1742
Anglican cemeteries in the United States
Cemeteries in Maryland
18th-century Episcopal church buildings
1706 establishments in Maryland
Religious organizations established in 1706
Swedish-American history
Finnish-American history
New Sweden
Churches in New Sweden